The CWF Mid-Atlantic Television Championship was a professional wrestling main championship in Carolina Wrestling Federation Mid-Atlantic (CWF Mid-Atlantic). It was the original cruiserweight title of the Carolina Wrestling Federation promotion, later used in the Frontier Wrestling Alliance (2001–2004) and AWA Superstars (2005–2007) as a regional title, officially representing the Mid-Atlantic United States, while it was a member of the respective governing bodies. It remained active until November 2003 when the CWF reclassified the title as a television championship.

The inaugural champion was The Gemini Kid, who was awarded the title in 2000 to become the first CWF Cruiserweight Champion. Lee Valiant holds the record for most reigns, with three. At 393 days, Mikael Yamaha's first reign is the longest in the title's history. Valiant's first reign was the shortest in the history of the title, lasting only seven days. Overall, there have been 47 reigns shared between 37 wrestlers, with one vacancy.

Title history

Combined reigns

References
General

Specific

External links

CWF Mid-Atlantic Heavyweight Title at Genickbruch.com
CWF Mid-Atlantic Heavyweight Title at Cagematch.de

CWF Mid-Atlantic championships
Cruiserweight wrestling championships
Television wrestling championships
United States regional professional wrestling championships